Berges du Lac tram stop is a tram stop on line C of the Tramway de Bordeaux. It is located on Cours de Québec in the north of the city of Bordeaux. The stop is operated by Transports Bordeaux Métropole.

For most of the day on Mondays to Fridays, trams run at least every ten minutes in both directions. Services run less frequently in the early morning, late evenings, weekends and public holidays.

References

External links 
 

Tram stops in Bordeaux
Bordeaux tramway stops
Railway stations in France opened in 2014